The Sydney gang rapes were a series of gang rape attacks committed by a group of up to 14 youths led by Bilal Skaf against Australian women and teenage girls (2 with Italian parents, 1 with Greek parents and one part Aboriginal girl), as young as 14, in Sydney, New South Wales, Australia across several days in 2000. The crimes, described as ethnically motivated hate crimes by officials and commentators, were covered extensively by the news media, and prompted the passing of new laws. In 2002, the nine men convicted of the gang rapes were sentenced to a total of more than 240 years in jail. According to court transcripts, Judge Michael Finnane described the rapes as events that "you hear about or read about only in the context of wartime atrocities".

Attacks

Further attempted attacks
A further series of gang rapes were said to have been attempted but thwarted. Four of the attackers were also convicted for an attack on Friday 4 August 2000 when they approached a fourteen-year-old girl on a train where she was threatened with violence, punched twice, slapped, and told that she would be forced to perform fellatio on several men and that she was going to be raped.

Attackers

Bilal Skaf led and orchestrated the three August 2000 attacks. He was initially sentenced to a total of 55 years' imprisonment but had his sentence for these attacks reduced by the New South Wales Court of Criminal Appeal to 28 years, with no parole for the first 22 years. However, on 28 July 2006, Acting Justice Jane Mathews added another ten years to his sentence for his role in the 12 August rape. His original conviction over this attack had been quashed in 2004 and a retrial ordered after it was revealed that two jurors had conducted their own investigations at Gosling Park. Bilal Skaf is eligible for release on parole from 11 February 2033. In March 2003, Skaf was charged with sending mail containing white powder to a corrections department official from prison in an apparent hoax terrorist act. In April 2015, he was attacked by two other inmates in jail and sustained "serious facial injuries".
Mohammed Skaf, younger brother of Bilal Skaf, was one of the gang rapists. He was sentenced to 32 years for his role in the gang rapes, but also had his sentence reduced on appeal, to 19 years with a non-parole period of 11 years. However, on 28 July 2006, he received an additional 15 years, with a minimum of seven and a half years over the Gosling Park attack. He was then eligible for release on parole from 1 July 2019. Skaf showed no remorse for his crimes, making sexually inappropriate remarks to female staff at the Kariong Juvenile Justice Centre where he was incarcerated and continued to blame his victims for initially agreeing to go with him because "they came out with us as soon as I asked them." His parole was denied in February 2020, with The State Parole Authority mentioning that "it appears that he still blames the victims for his offending, has no victim empathy and refuses to take responsibility for his actions" His parole was denied again in November 2020. Mohammed Skaf was released under "strict parole" conditions on 6 October 2021. The release on parole means Skaf can be under "heavy surveillance" for 26 months. He will be monitored electronically for 24 hours-a-day, and has also been banned from some areas in Western Sydney.
Belal Hajeid, then 20, was another gang rapist who was convicted and imprisoned for 23 years with a non-parole period of 15 years. Hajeid later had his sentence reduced on appeal.
Mohammed Sanoussi, then 18, gang rapist who was sentenced to 21 years with a non-parole period of 12 years for the 10 and 30 August rapes. Sanoussi later had his sentence reduced to 16 years on appeal. Shortly after Sanoussi's conviction, his brother and cousin were banned from visiting him in prison for three months after a rowdy clash with staff at the Kariong Juvenile Justice Centre where he was incarcerated. Shouting broke out when staff removed the visitors after they had tried to pass newspaper clippings to the brothers about their sentencing the previous day. Sanoussi remained behind bars when denied parole for a second time in October 2011. Parole applications were rejected on three occasions. He has been on weekend leave since October 2012 and day leave since April 2013. On 5 September 2013, Sanoussi was granted parole with strict conditions but was not immediately released. The next day, his parole was revoked. Upon release, Sanoussi was to live at his family's home. However, late on 5 September it became known that his two brothers, who also lived there and are linked to the "Brothers for Life" gang, had been charged, with two others, with a violent assault. The State Parole Authority met and decided that "... the previously approved accommodation was not suitable in light of the new information." On appeal, Judge Terence Christie conceded that his brother's crimes had nothing to do with Sanoussi and that he should be released. Sanoussi was paroled on 10 October 2013. Among other conditions, he is not to have contact with his two brothers without permission.
Mahmoud Sanoussi, brother of Mohammed Sanoussi, then 17, was sentenced to 11 years and three months' imprisonment with parole available after six-and-a-half years. He unsuccessfully appealed against his sentence in 2005. He was released on parole in May 2009 but had his parole revoked in March 2010 for his drug use.
Mahmoud Chami, then 20, was sentenced to 18 years with a non-parole period of ten years. Chami unsuccessfully appealed against his sentence in 2004. He was released to parole in April 2013.
"H" (Identity sealed: H has had his name suppressed under court order because of his "intellectual and mental disabilities"), then 19, was sentenced to 25 years with a non-parole period of 15 years. 'H' later had his sentence reduced on appeal. A parole hearing was held in October 2013, and he was released in February 2014 under strict parole conditions.
Tayyab Sheikh, then 16, was initially sentenced to 15 years' imprisonment with a non-parole period of nine years for his role in the 30 August rape. He was retried and sentenced to eight years and six months' imprisonment, with a non-parole period of four years and six months. He was released from prison in late June 2007.
Mohammed Ghanem, then 19, was the final person to be sentenced and was imprisoned for 40 years with a non-parole period of 26 years for two counts of rape. Ghanem, like his co-offenders Bilal Skaf and Mohammed Skaf showed no remorse for his actions, effectively opting to "tough it out" at the Kariong Juvenile Justice Centre, where he was detained while awaiting trial.

There was evidence to convict only nine men of the fourteen suspects. The sentences totalled 240 years in prison.

Racial controversy
Conservative commentators such as Miranda Devine categorised the crimes as racially or religiously motivated hate crimes. She also asserted that much of the media had attempted to "airbrush" the racial element out of reporting on the crime spree; the victims said that all mention of the overtly racist statements made by the perpetrators had been "censored" from their official statements because their presence would complicate attempts to negotiate guilty pleas with the accused. Critics also claimed that, if the situation had been reversed, with a gang of white Australian men raping Muslim Australians "who deserved it because they were Muslim", there would have been very different treatment.

The Sydney Morning Herald reported that the rapists had stated to a victim during the attack, "You deserve it because you're an Australian" and "I'm going to fuck you Leb-style". Two thirds of Muslim and Arab Australians said that they experienced an increase in racial vilification towards them after a number of events including the September 11 attacks, the Bali bombings, and these rapes.

New laws
The gang rapes led to the passage of new legislation through the Parliament of New South Wales, increasing the sentences for gang rapists by creating a new category of crime known as "aggravated sexual assault in company".

Also, in the course of one of the trials, the defendants refused counsel as they believed that "all lawyers were against Muslims". This led to the contentious prospect of the defendants being able to cross-examine the witnesses, including the victims, a situation that was averted by further legislation being put through the state parliament.

Actions taken by government ministers, including Premier of New South Wales Bob Carr, who publicly identified the perpetrators' background, led to controversy. Ethnic community group leaders, including Keysar Trad of the Lebanese Muslim Association, complained that Carr was smearing the entire Lebanese Muslim community with the crimes of a few of its members and that his public comments would stir up ethnic hatred.

The first court case heard under the new sentencing regime concerned the Ashfield gang rapes of girls by Pakistani and Nepalese immigrants in Ashfield on 28 July 2002.

Role of technology in coordination of the attacks
The attackers used SMS and mobile phones to orchestrate the attack and to phone ahead to other attackers to co-ordinate transport of rape gang members to the locations where women were being held. Authorities later released some of this material, recovered from the rapists' mobile phones

The attackers texted violent anti-Christian messages, such as, "When you are feeling down... bash a Christian or Catholic and lift up". And as well as sexually degrading texts like, "I've got a slut with me bro, come to Punchbowl".

Skaf gang rape psychologist
In July 2019, it was revealed that Joanne Natalie Senior, a former prison psychologist who was fired for having a relationship with a Skaf gang rapist and who married another member of the notorious child rape gang, was working with children as a school counsellor at Malek Fahd Islamic School.

See also
 Ashfield gang rapes

References

External links
"Sentence Slashed: "Gang rapes not 'Worst Category'
The Guardian: Racially Motivated Crime and Punishment
 ABC TV's Four Corners: "...For being Lebanese"
 ABC TV: Sentencing hearing of Bilal Skaf
"The 'Young Muslim Man' in Australian Public Discourse" by Kiran Grewal, Transforming Cultures eJournal, Vol.2, No.1, November 2007

City of Canterbury-Bankstown
2000 crimes in Australia
Child sexual abuse in Australia
Crime in Sydney
Gang rape in Oceania
Gangs in Australia
Hate crime
Rape in Australia
Racism in Australia
20th century in Sydney
Persecution of Christians by Muslims
2000s in Sydney
Incidents of violence against girls